The African wild ass (Equus africanus) or African wild donkey is a wild member of the horse family, Equidae. This species is thought to be the ancestor of the domestic donkey (Equus asinus), which is sometimes placed within the same species. They live in the deserts and other arid areas of the Horn of Africa, in Eritrea, Ethiopia and Somalia. It formerly had a wider range north and west into Sudan, Egypt, and Libya. It is Critically Endangered, with about 570 individuals existing in the wild.

Description

The short, smooth coat is a light grey to fawn colour, fading quickly to white on the undersides and legs. There is a slender, dark dorsal stripe in all subspecies, while in the Nubian wild ass (E. a. africanus), as well as the domestic donkey, there is a stripe across the shoulder. The legs of the Somali wild ass (E. a. somaliensis) are horizontally striped with black, resembling those of a zebra. On the nape of the neck, there is a stiff, upright mane, the hairs of which are tipped with black. The ears are large with black margins. The tail terminates with a black brush. The hooves are slender and approximately of the diameter as the legs.

Evolution

The genus Equus, which includes all extant equines, is believed to have evolved from Dinohippus, via the intermediate form Plesippus. One of the oldest species is Equus simplicidens, described as zebra-like with a donkey-shaped head. The oldest fossil to date is ~3.5 million years old from Idaho, USA. The genus appears to have spread quickly into the Old World, with the similarly aged Equus livenzovensis documented from western Europe and Russia.

Molecular phylogenies indicate the most recent common ancestor of all modern equids (members of the genus Equus) lived ~5.6 (3.9–7.8) mya. Direct paleogenomic sequencing of a 700,000-year-old middle Pleistocene horse metapodial bone from Canada implies a more recent 4.07 Myr before present date for the most recent common ancestor (MRCA) within the range of 4.0 to 4.5 Myr BP. The oldest divergencies are the Asian hemiones (subgenus E. (Asinus), including the kulan, onager, and kiang), followed by the African zebras (subgenera E. (Dolichohippus), and E. (Hippotigris)). All other modern forms including the domesticated horse (and many fossil Pliocene and Pleistocene forms) belong to the subgenus E. (Equus) which diverged ~4.8 (3.2–6.5) million years ago.

Taxonomy
Different authors consider the African wild ass and the domesticated donkey one or two species; either view is technically legitimate, though the former is phylogenetically more accurate. However, the American Society of Mammalogists classifies the donkey as a distinct species, as it does with almost all domestic mammals.

The species name for the African wild ass is sometimes given as asinus, from the domestic donkey, whose specific name is older and usually would have priority. But this usage is erroneous since the International Commission on Zoological Nomenclature has conserved the name Equus africanus in Opinion 2027. This was done to prevent the confusing situation of the phylogenetic ancestor being taxonomically included in its descendant.

Thus, if one species is recognized, the correct scientific name of the donkey is E. africanus asinus.

The first published name for the African wild ass, Asinus africanus, Fitzinger, 1858, is a nomen nudum. The name Equus taeniopus von Heuglin, 1861 is rejected as indeterminable, as it is based on an animal that cannot be identified and may have been a hybrid between a domestic donkey and a Somali wild ass; the type has not been preserved. The first available name thus becomes Asinus africanus von Heuglin & Fitzinger, 1866. A lectotype is designated: a skull of an adult female collected by von Heuglin near Atbarah River, Sudan, and present in the State Museum of Natural History Stuttgart, MNS 32026. The two subspecies recognized:

Habitat
African wild asses are well suited to life in a desert or semidesert environment. They have tough digestive systems, which can break down desert vegetation and extract moisture from food efficiently. They can also go without water for a fairly long time. Their large ears give them an excellent sense of hearing and help in cooling.
Because of the sparse vegetation in their environment wild asses live somewhat separated from each other (except for mothers and young), unlike the tightly grouped herds of wild horses.

Behavior
The African wild ass is primarily active in the cooler hours between late afternoon and early morning, seeking shade and shelter amongst the rocky hills during the day. The Somali wild ass is also very agile and nimble-footed, capable of moving quickly across boulder fields and in the mountains. In keeping with these feats, its soles are particularly hard and its hooves grow very quickly.

Mature males defend large territories around 23 square kilometres in size, marking them with dung heaps – an essential marker in the flat, monotonous terrain. Due to the size of these ranges, the dominant male cannot exclude other males. Rather, intruders are tolerated –  recognized and treated as subordinates, and kept as far away as possible from any of the resident females. In the presence of estrous females, the males bray loudly. These animals live in loose herds of up to fifty individuals.

In the wild, African wild ass breeding occurs during the wet season. The gestation period lasts for 11 to 12 months, and one foal is born during the period from October to February. The foal weans for 6 to 8 months after birth, reaching sexual maturity at the age of 2 years. Lifespan is up to 40 years in captivity.

Wild asses can run swiftly, almost as fast as a horse. However, unlike most hoofed mammals, their tendency is to not flee right away from a potentially dangerous situation, but to investigate first before deciding what to do. When they need to, they can defend themselves with kicks from both their front and hind legs. Equids were used in ancient Sumer to pull wagons circa 2600 BC, and then chariots on the Standard of Ur, circa 2000 BC. These have been suggested to represent onagers, but are now thought to have been domesticated asses.

Diet

The African wild asses' diet consists of grasses, bark, and leaves. Despite being primarily adapted for living in an arid climate, they are dependent on water, and when not receiving the needed moisture from vegetation, they must drink at least once every three days. However, they can survive on a surprisingly small amount of liquid, and have been reported to drink salty or brackish water.

Conservation status

Though the species itself is under no threat of extinction, due to abundant domestic stock (donkeys and burros), the two extant wild subspecies are both listed as critically endangered. African wild asses have been captured for domestication for centuries and this, along with interbreeding between wild and domestic animals, has caused a distinct decline in population numbers. There are now only a few hundred individuals left in the wild. These animals are also hunted for food and for traditional medicine in both Ethiopia and Somalia. Competition with domestic livestock for grazing, and restricted access to water supplies caused by agricultural developments, pose further threats to the survival of this species. The African wild ass is legally protected in the countries where it is currently found, although these measures often prove difficult to enforce. A protected population of the Somali wild ass exists in the Yotvata Hai-Bar Nature Reserve in Israel, to the north of Eilat. This reserve was established in 1968 with the view to bolster populations of endangered desert species. Populations of horses and asses are fairly resilient and, if the species is properly protected, it may well recover from its current low.

In captivity
There are about 150 individual Somali wild asses living in zoos around the globe, of which 36 were born at Zoo Basel, where this species' breeding program started with Basel's first Somali wild asses in 1970 and the first birth in 1972.

Zoo Basel manages the European studbook for the Somali wild ass and coordinates the European Endangered Species Programme (EEP). All European wild donkeys are either descendants of the original group at Zoo Basel or of 12 others that came from the Yotvata Hai-Bar Nature Reserve in Israel in 1972.

See also
 Endangered species
 Fauna of Africa
 Feral donkeys in Australia
 Asiatic wild ass

References
This article incorporates CC BY-3.0 text from the reference.

Notes

External links

African Wild Ass at ARKive
Wild Equids
Profile at the U.S. Fish & Wildlife Service Species
African Wild Ass - Equus africanus at the IUCN/SSC Equid Specialist Group
Equus asinus, in Don E. Wilson & DeeAnn M. Reeder (editors). 2005. . A Taxonomic and Geographic Reference (3rd ed), Johns Hopkins University Press, 2,142 pp. .

 
Asinus
Equines of Africa
Fauna of East Africa
Fauna of the Horn of Africa
Mammals of Sudan
Mammals of Ethiopia
EDGE species
Critically endangered fauna of Africa
African wild ass
Taxa named by Theodor von Heuglin
Mammals of Eritrea

bg:Нубийско диво магаре